Mark Fell is a Rotherham-based music producer and artist. He has released several albums under his own name, with the duo SND he shares with Mat Steel, under the moniker Sensate Focus, and in various collaborations. He also maintains a sound art installation practice. Fell's work primarily explores the politics and ideologies of electronic dance music and experimental music culture, and is noted for its restrained and minimal style, which writer Dan Barrow described in The Wire as "fragments of dance genres . . . torn from their contexts and stripped down to their barest logic, each component probed and rearranged until it makes provisional sense".

Discography

Mark Fell and collaborations

LPs
Shirt Trax (with Jeremy Potter) ‘Good News About Space’ (1999) OR Recordings

Shirt Trax (with Jeremy Potter) ‘Chewables’ fals.ch recordings
Multistability (2010), Raster-Noton
UL8 (2010), Editions Mego
Periodic Orbits of a Dynamic System Related to a Knot (2011), Editions Mego
Manitutshu (2011), Editions Mego
Sentielle Objectif Actualité (2012), Editions Mego
n-Dimensional Analysis (2013), Liberation Technologies
The Neurobiology of Moral Decision Making (2015), The Death of Rave. Collaboration with Gábor Lázár.
Intra (2018), Boomkat Editions

Sensate Focus

With SND

References

External links
Artist website

British electronic musicians
British sound artists
Musicians from Sheffield